Review Philippines is a Philippine television newscast show broadcast by GMA Pinoy TV and Q. Anchored by Mike Enriquez, it premiered in June 2005 on GMA Pinoy TV then on Q on August 11, 2007. The show concluded in 2008.

References

Q (TV network) news shows
GMA Integrated News and Public Affairs shows
Philippine television news shows
2005 Philippine television series debuts
2008 Philippine television series endings
English-language television shows